Lake II is the second studio album by Lake, released in 1978.

Track listing
All tracks written by Detlef Petersen and James Hopkins-Harrison except as indicated

Side One
 "Welcome to the West" - 5:07
 "See Them Glow" - 4:59
 "Letters of Love"- 3:40
 "Red Lake" (J. Hopkins-Harrison, Geoffrey Peacey) - 4:57 (background vocal: Beach Boy Carl Wilson)
 "Love's the Jailor"(*) - 4:29
(*)This is the correct title per the original LP release; later CD releases have it as "Love's a Jailer".

Side Two
 "Lost by the Wayside" (J. Hopkins-Harrison, Geoffrey Peacey) - 4:25
 "Highway 216" - 3:37
 "Angel in Disguise" - 4:28
 "Scoobie Doobies" (J. Hopkins-Harrison, Geoffrey Peacey) - 7:44

Personnel
Dieter Ahrendt - drums and percussion
Alex Conti - guitar and vocals
James Hopkins-Harrison - lead vocals
Geoffrey Peacey - keyboards, vocals, and guitar
Detlef Petersen - keyboards and vocals
Martin Tiefensee - bass guitar

Produced by Detlef Petersen and Lake
Engineered by Geoffrey Peacey
Recorded at Russl Studios, Hamburg, Rockfield Studios, South Wales, Caribou Ranch, Colorado
String arrangements on "Love's the Jailor" by Peter Hecht
Mixed at Caribou Ranch, Colorado, and Russl Studios, Hamburg
Cover illustration by James McMullan
Design by Paula Scher

LP: Columbia Records JC 35289
CD: Renaissance RMED0126

1978 albums
Columbia Records albums